Squash Australia is the national organisation for squash in Australia, as recognised by the Professional Squash Association and the World Squash Federation. It was founded in 1934 and is based in Brisbane.[3] It organises and/or oversees many professional tournaments each year, along with many other official squash events.

Australian Squash is the leading Australian sport when compared by medals won against medals available at the Commonwealth Games. At the 2018 Commonwealth Games Australia won two gold medals and one bronze medal.

Robert Donaghue has been the CEO of Squash Australia since 25 January 2021.

In 2018 Squash Australia opened a new six-court centre at Carrara on the Gold Coast. The centre, now known as the National Squash Centre, hosted the 2019 World Doubles Championships, where Australia won 8 medals. The National Squash Centre will also host the 2021 World Doubles Championships.

See also
 Squash in Australia

References

Squash
Squash in Australia
1934 establishments in Australia
Sports organizations established in 1934
Organisations based in Brisbane
National members of the World Squash Federation